Dimitrios Voulgaris (20 December 1802 – 10 January 1877) was a Greek revolutionary fighter during the Greek War of Independence of 1821 who became a politician after independence. He was nicknamed "Tsoumpes" ("Τσουμπές") after the distinctive Ottoman-style robe he wore.

Biography
Voulgaris was an Arvanite, born on December 20th 1802 on the island of Hydra in the Saronic Islands. When the War of Independence broke out, he participated in naval operations against the forces of the Ottoman Empire. After independence was achieved, Voulgaris became involved in politics as a bitter opponent of Governor Ioannis Kapodistrias.

In 1843, Voulgaris was appointed to the newly created Senate and in 1847, he became Minister for the Navy. He became the 11th Prime Minister for the first time in 1855 during the Crimean War. He was elected to the post again in elections marked by widespread corruption and fraud.

Voulgaris was involved in the coup against Otto of Greece in October 1862 and became Prime Minister once more. In total, he was Prime Minister eight times; however, his terms in office where characterised by corruption. Finally, in 1875, Charilaos Trikoupis published his famous article "Who is to blame?" ("Τις πταίει;") in the Athens daily "Times" ("Καιροί") concerning the waste and corruption of the government. After a strong public outcry, King George I dismissed Voulgaris. Many of his associates were indicted on a variety of charges and Voulgaris himself took ill and died in Athens on 10 January 1878.

References

External links
 Δημήτριος Βούλγαρης

1802 births
1878 deaths
19th-century prime ministers of Greece
Ministers of Naval Affairs of Greece
Prime Ministers of Greece
People from Hydra (island)
French Party politicians
Corruption in Greece